Rolv Eriksrud (born 17 October 1978) from Drammen is a Norwegian ski mountaineer and cross-country skier. Together with Ola Berger, Ola Herje Hovdenak and Ove-Erik Tronvoll, he finished seventh in the relay event of the 2009 European Championship of Ski Mountaineering.

External links 
 Rolv Eriksrud at skimountaineering.org

1978 births
Living people
Norwegian male ski mountaineers
Norwegian male cross-country skiers
Sportspeople from Drammen